The 2021 Egypt Cup Final was the 89th Egypt Cup Final, the final match of the 2020–21 Egypt Cup, Africa's oldest football cup competition played at Cairo Stadium in Cairo, Egypt, on 21 July 2022 between Al Ahly and Zamalek.

Since the competition wouldn't finish by the CAF deadline  for associations to submit participating teams in African competitions for the 2021–22 season, for the second Consecutive time the spot awarded to the Egypt Cup winners (Confederation Cup preliminary or first round) was passed to the fourth-placed team in the 2020–21 Egyptian Premier League, Pyramids.

Route to the final

In all results below, the score of the finalist is given first. From the round of 16, all matches were played on neutral grounds.

Al Ahly

As an Egyptian Premier League club, Al Ahly started in the round of 32 where they were drawn with Egyptian Second Division team Al Nasr. Al Ahly won 2–1 with one goal from Walid Soliman and one from Walter Bwalya. In the round of 16, they drew fellow Egyptian Premier League team ENPPI and won 1–0 with Salah Mohsen scoring the only goal of the game. In the quarter-finals, they were drawn with Egyptian Premier League side Pyramids, the team that eliminated Al Ahly from the round of 16 of 2018–19 Egypt Cup, Al Ahly was able to avenge their last meeting loss and won 2–1 with one goal from Taher Mohamed and one from Hossam Hassan. In the semi-finals, they were drawn with Egyptian Premier League side Petrojet and progressed to the final after a 2–0 win with Afsha and Mohamed Abdelmonem on the scoresheet, this was the first match for Al Ahly new manager Ricardo Soares.

Zamalek

As an Egyptian Premier League club, Zamalek also started in the round of 32. They were drawn at home against Egyptian Second Division side Haras El Hodoud. Zamalek won 3–1 with a goal from Youssef Obama and two goals from Mahmoud Alaa. In the round of 16, they drew fellow Egyptian Premier League team Ismaily and won 1–0 thanks to a goal from Achraf Bencharki.In the quarter finals, they played against fellow Egyptian Premier League side Misr Lel Makkasa and won 2–0 with the two goals scored by Youssef Obama. In the semi-finals, they were drawn against Egyptian Premier League side Aswan and progressed to the final after a 2–1 win with one goal from a goal from Youssef Obama and a goal from Mahmoud Alaa.

Match

Details

Statistics

Notes

References

Final
Egypt Cup Finals
2020–21 in Egyptian football
Egypt Cup Final 2021
Egypt Cup Final 2021